Patrick E. Dealy (November 12, 1861 – December 16, 1924) was a Major League Baseball player. He debuted with the St. Paul Saints of the Union Association in 1884 as their backup catcher, which was his primary position throughout his career (he also played substantial numbers of games at shortstop, third base, and the outfield). He then played three seasons in the National League, with the Boston Beaneaters in 1885 and 1886 and Washington Nationals in 1887. His final season came with the Syracuse Stars of the American Association.

References 

Major League Baseball catchers
St. Paul Saints (UA) players
Boston Beaneaters players
Washington Nationals (1886–1889) players
Syracuse Stars (AA) players
St. Paul Apostles players
Stillwater (minor league baseball) players
Troy Trojans (minor league) players
Buffalo Bisons (minor league) players
Olean (minor league baseball) players
Kingston Patriarchs players
Kingston Colonials players
Baseball players from Vermont
1861 births
1924 deaths
19th-century baseball players
People from Underhill, Vermont